Tempus With His Right Side Companion Niko is a novelized collection of fourteen previously-published short stories in the Sacred Band series by Janet Morris. Originally published in 1987 by Baen, it was reissued in 2011 by Paradise Publishing.

Reception

Robert W. Cape, Jr., in Classical Traditions in Science Fiction wrote of Tempus (1987; 2011), Tempus Unbound (1989; 2017) and The Sacred Band (2010) "A fantasy series about the Sacred Band of Stepsons, an elite army modeled on the fourth-century B.C.E. Sacred Band of Thebes. The stories explore the fraught personal relationships of mixed hetero- and homosexual troops, only sometimes paired, as they fight for their commander, the immortal Tempus. Morris includes archaeological and historical details, from physical items to social practices, religion, and philosophy, to create a fantasy world that is, in many ways, more historically accurate than many popular accounts of antiquity."

References 

1987 American novels
American fantasy novels
American short story collections
Novels by Janet Morris
1987 short story collections